The Diviciorii Mari is a right tributary of the river Fizeș in Romania. It flows into the Fizeș near Fizeșu Gherlii.

References

Rivers of Romania
Rivers of Cluj County